Baylor Scott & White Medical Center – Temple is a 636-bed multi-specialty teaching hospital located in Temple, Texas. The facility was founded in 1897, when Dr. Arthur C. Scott and Dr. Raleigh R. White Jr. opened the Temple Sanitarium in Temple, Texas. The group practice consists of over 800 physicians and scientists. The primary clinical teaching campus of Texas A&M Health Science Center College of Medicine, Baylor Scott & White – Temple is ranked as one of the top 100 hospitals and one of the top 15 teaching hospitals in the United States by Thomson Reuters.  Baylor Scott & White – Temple has 31 accredited residency and fellowship programs, including programs in emergency medicine, radiology and offers a well-established and respected chaplain resident program.

In 2013, Scott & White merged with Baylor Health Care System to form Baylor Scott & White Health. In October 2018, Baylor Scott & White Health and Memorial Hermann announced their plan to merge.

Temple Sanitarium 

Scott and White opened the Temple Sanitarium in 1904 to build upon a growing private practice that served railroad employees passing through Temple. That year they purchased St. Mary's Catholic Convent and converted it for use as a full-time hospital. Corporately chartered in 1905 "for the study, prevention, relief, remedy and care of any and all human disorders and diseases", the sanitarium would eventually consist of 31 buildings scattered on five city blocks. The first female anesthesiologist to work in Texas and in the United States was Dr. Claudia Potter, hired on June 23, 1906.

On March 2, 1917, Dr. White died of a heart attack. Dr. Scott petitioned to change the name to the "Raleigh White" Memorial Hospital, in honor of his late partner, but instead it was changed to "Scott & White" Memorial Hospital on October 13, 1922.

Organization 

Following the death of Dr. White, the partnership was changed to Dr. Scott Sr. his brother-in-law, Dr. Marcel W. Sherwood, and Dr. George V. Brindley Sr., in 1917. Dr. Scott's son, Dr. Arthur C. Scott Jr., took over the presidency when his father died of a heart attack on October 27, 1940. On December 23, 1949, for-profit Scott & White Clinic was separated from non-profit Scott & White Memorial Hospital. On August 15, 1950, the name was changed to Scott & White Memorial Hospital and Scott, Sherwood and Brindley Foundation. On November 6, 2016, Baylor Scott & White announced that Scott & White Memorial Hospital would be renamed Scott & White Medical Center as part of the organization's overall rebranding due to the merger of Baylor Health and Scott & White.

Scott & White Clinic 

Scott & White operates more than 60 primary, specialty and urgent care clinics at locations throughout Central Texas.

Each clinic is served by primary care physicians and many have appointments available with specialists. With on-site diagnostic and other sophisticated capabilities, area residents are cared for more conveniently.

Education and research 

S&W has been involved in training of medical, nursing, and allied health professionals since its inception. It serves at the main teaching hospital of Texas A&M Health Science Center and primary rotation site for University of Mary Hardin-Baylor, Temple College, and surrounding colleges. The hospital also supports a number of post-graduate residency and fellowship programs in medicine, surgery, and pharmacy.

Residency programs offered:

 Anesthesiology
 Dermatology
 Diagnostic Radiology
 Emergency Medicine
 Family Medicine
 General Surgery
 Internal Medicine
 Neurology
 Neurosurgery
 Obstetrics/Gynecology
 Ophthalmology
 Orthopedic Surgery
 Otolaryngology
 Pathology
 Pediatrics
 Plastic Surgery
 Podiatric Surgery
 Psychiatry
 Radiation Oncology (started 2012)
 Urology
 Vascular Surgery Fellowship

See also 
 List of hospitals in Texas

Notes

External links 
 

Hospital networks in the United States
Healthcare in Texas
Buildings and structures in Bell County, Texas
Medical and health organizations based in Texas
Trauma centers